Figure skating has been part of the Olympic Games since 1908 and has been included in 26 Olympic Games. There have been 286 medals (96 gold, 95 silver, and 95 bronze) awarded to figure skaters representing 29 representing National Olympic Committees. Six events have been contested but one, men's special figures, was discontinued after a single Olympics.

Canadian ice dancers Tessa Virtue and Scott Moir are the only figure skaters to win five Olympic medals (3 gold, 2 silver). Swedish figure skater Gillis Grafström (3 gold, 1 silver) and Russian figure skater Evgeni Plushenko (2 gold, 2 silver) each have four medals. Seventeen figure skaters have won three medals. The only skaters with three consecutive titles are Grafström in men's singles, Sonja Henie (Norway) in ladies' singles, and Irina Rodnina (Soviet Union) in pairs. Sixteen figure skaters have earned two golds within the same discipline and five skaters have earned gold in two separate Olympic events.

On two occasions, there has been a podium sweep. Russian figure skaters hold the unique record for earning gold medals in all six Olympic figure skating events. Three skaters won Olympic medals in multiple figure skating disciplines.

Medalists

Men's singles

Men's special figures

Men's special figures was only included in one Olympic Games before being discontinued. The sole winner of the event was Russian Nikolai Panin, who gave his country its first ever Olympic gold medal.

Ladies' singles

Pairs

Ice dance

Team event
The team event is the newest Olympic figure skating event, first contested in the 2014 Games. It combines the four Olympic figure skating disciplines (men's singles, ladies' singles, pairs, and ice dance) into a single event; gold is awarded to the team that earns the most placement points.

 Skaters who only competed in the short program/rhythm dance.
 Skaters who only competed in the free skating/dance.

Multi-medalists

Most medals
Gillis Grafström earned the most medals in a single event: four medals, three of which gold, in men's singles. The only other skaters to have earned three golds in a single discipline are Sonja Henie in ladies' singles and Irina Rodnina in pairs.

Counting multiple events, Tessa Virtue and Scott Moir hold the record for the most medals, with a total of five medals including two golds in ice dance and one team event gold. Evgeni Plushenko earned four medals, including a gold in men's singles and a team event gold.

Figure skaters who won three or more medal at the Olympics are listed below:

Multiple golds

The only skaters with three consecutive titles are Gillis Grafström in men's singles, Sonja Henie in ladies' singles, and Irina Rodnina in pairs. The most consecutive titles in ice dance is two, which has only been achieved by Oksana Grishuk and Evgeny Platov. In addition, one ladies' singles skater, three men's singles skaters, and five pairs skaters have earned consecutive titles. Two ice dancers and three pair skaters have earned non-consecutive titles.

Five skaters have won Olympic gold medals in multiple events. Evgeni Plushenko won gold in men's singles in 2006 and team event gold in 2014. Tatiana Volosozhar and Maxim Trankov were the first skaters to win multiple events at a single Olympics, winning both pairs and the team event. Tessa Virtue and Scott Moir matched this feat four years later, earning golds in ice dance and the team event.

Multi-medalists by event

Men's singles

Ladies' singles

Pairs

Ice dance

Team event

Multiple events
Only three skaters have won Olympic medals in multiple figure skating disciplines. All other multi-event medalists won medals in their discipline plus the team event (which, while being a separate event, is not considered its own skating discipline).

Two disciplines
In 1908, Madge Syers became the first skater to medal in multiple figure skating disciplines at a single Olympics. The only skater to match this feat was Ernst Baier in 1936. The only other skater to medal in multiple disciplines was Beatrix Loughran who did so at separate Olympics.

No skater has won gold medals in multiple disciplines.

One discipline plus team event
The team event was introduced at the 2014 Winter Olympics. It allowed skaters to medal twice while skating one discipline.

On 9 February 2014, Evgeni Plushenko became the first skater to win multiple figure skating events. On 12 February 2014, Tatiana Volosozhar and Maxim Trankov became the first skaters to win multiple events at a single Olympics. Four years later, Tessa Virtue and Scott Moir matched this feat.

The below table lists all skaters who have medaled in their own discipline and in the team event. (The number of team event medals are listed in parenthesis with a "T".)

Summer and Winter Games
Since figure skating was held during the Summer Olympic Games in 1908 and 1920 before being moved to the Winter Olympic Games, three skaters medaled in figure skating in both the Summer and Winter Games.

Men's singles skater Gillis Grafström's first gold medal was earned at the 1920 Summer Olympics. His other three medals were won at the 1924–1932 Winter Games. Pair skaters Ludowika Jakobsson and Walter Jakobsson also earned gold during the 1920 Summer Olympics. They later medaled at the 1924 Winter Games.

Country records

Winning streak
From 1964 to 2006, Russian figure skaters—representing the Soviet Union, the Unified Team, or Russia—won the gold medal in the pairs event, in what is the longest series of victories for one country in one winter event.

Most Medals 
As of 2022, Russia surpassed the United States in ranking the most medals than any other country in figure skating. Having won a total of 60 medals of which are 30 gold, 21 sliver, & 9 bronze. Competing  and representing under the Russian Empire, Soviet Union, Unified Team, Russian Federation, Olympic Athletes from Russia, & Russian Olympic Committee. Viktor Petrenko 1988 Bronze Medal & 1992 Gold Medal in Men's singles, who represented the Soviet Union & Unified Team is excluded from this count as Petrenko is Ukrainian  and would later represent Ukraine at the 1994 Winter Olympics. This count only applies to Russian athletes as the majority of Soviet figure skaters are Russian or were born in Russian SSR.

Competing under the Russian Olympic Committee (ROC). Russia became the first country to win six medals in a single Olympics at Beijing 2022. Two gold in the Team Event & Ladies Singles, three sliver in Ice dance, Ladies Singles, & Pairs, and one bronze in Pairs.

Events won
Russian figure skaters, counting both Russian Federation (IOC code RUS) and Russian Empire (IOC code RU1), hold the unique record for earning gold medals in all six Olympic figure skating events. Since men's special figures was discontinued, this record can not be matched.

Russia (IOC code RUS) is the only NOC to have earning gold medals in all five current Olympic figure skating events. Canada has earned gold medals in four of the events (all except men's singles). Great Britain, Unified Team, and United States have earned gold medals in three of the events.

Russia and the Unified Team are the only NOCs to have won three events at the same Olympics, at the 2014 Winter Olympics and the 1992 Winter Olympics respectively. No NOC has won more than three figure skating events at a single Olympics.

Podium sweeps
There has been two podium sweeps in Olympic figure skating history. This is when athletes from one NOC win all three medals in a single event.

Medal totals by country

Men's singles

Men's special figures

Ladies' singles

Pairs

Ice dance

Team event

Age records

See also
 Figure skating at the Olympic Games
 List of Olympic medalists in figure skating by age
 World Figure Skating Championships
 Major achievements in figure skating by nation

Notes

References
General
 
 ISU – Olympic Games Figure Skating results:
 1908–2002 Men Ladies Pairs Ice dance
 2006 2010 2014 2018 2022

Specific

External links
 List of Olympic medalists in men's figure skating: photos and autographs

Figure skating
Olympic Games
Olympic medalists
Olympic medalists in figure skating
medalists